Blithfield is a civil parish in the district of East Staffordshire, Staffordshire, England.  It contains 27 listed buildings that are recorded in the National Heritage List for England.  Of these, two are listed at Grade I, the highest of the three grades, three are at Grade II*, the middle grade, and the others are at Grade II, the lowest grade. The most important buildings in the parish are St Leonard's Church and Blithfield Hall, which are both listed at Grade I. Most of the other listed buildings in the parish are associated with these buildings, and include items in the churchyard. and around or in the grounds of the hall.  The parish includes the village of Admaston, and is otherwise rural.  The other listed buildings are houses, farmhouses and farm buildings, and a former school.


Key

Buildings

References

Citations

Sources

Lists of listed buildings in Staffordshire